Raúl Cárdenas de la Vega (30 October 1928 – 26 March 2016) was a Mexican professional footballer and manager. He represented Mexico at the 1948 Olympics.

Playing career

Club
Born in Mexico City, Cárdenas began playing football with Real Club España, making his Mexican Primera División debut against Asturias F.C. in the 1947–48 season. He would play three seasons with España before the club withdrew from the league. He also competed for Mexico at the 1948 Summer Olympics.

Cárdenas played for Guadalajara, C.D. Marte and Puebla, before joining Zacatepec for 10 seasons. He retired from playing at age 37, becoming a coach for Cruz Azul.

International
Cárdenas represented the Mexico national team as a player in three FIFA World Cups: 1954, 1958 and 1962 tournaments. He earned a total of 37 caps, scoring 3 goals.

Managerial career
Cárdenas had four separate stints coaching the national team, including in the 1970 FIFA World Cup, held in home soil, where they reached the quarterfinals for the first time in their history. He also managed Cruz Azul towards their first 5 titles in 7 years in 8 finals. He also managed Club América for their 3rd title.

Cárdenas died in Cuernavaca, Morelos, on 25 March 2016, aged 87.

Honours

Player
Individual
IFFHS CONCACAF Men's Team of All Time: 2021

Manager
Cruz Azul
Primera División: 1968–69, Mexico '70, 1971–72, 1972–73, 1973–74
CONCACAF Champions' Cup: 1969, 1970, 1971

América
Primera División: 1975–76
CONCACAF Champions' Cup: 1977

References

External links
 

1928 births
2016 deaths
Association football central defenders
Footballers from Mexico City
Mexico international footballers
Mexican football managers
Olympic footballers of Mexico
Footballers at the 1948 Summer Olympics
1954 FIFA World Cup players
1958 FIFA World Cup players
1962 FIFA World Cup players
1970 FIFA World Cup managers
Mexico national football team managers
Liga MX players
C.D. Guadalajara footballers
Club Puebla players
Club Atlético Zacatepec players
Cruz Azul managers
Club América managers
Deportivo Toluca F.C. managers
Real Club España footballers
Mexican footballers